The Sperry Hills are a low mountain range in the northern Mojave Desert—southern Amargosa Desert region, in northeastern San Bernardino County, southern California.

They are located south of Shoshone, east of Death Valley National Park, and west of the Dumont Hills.

See also
Other ranges in the local area include the:
 Avawatz Mountains
 Dumont Hills
 Saddle Peak Hills
 Salt Spring Hills
 Silurian Hills
 Valjean Hills

References 

Mountain ranges of the Mojave Desert
Amargosa Desert
Mountain ranges of San Bernardino County, California
Hills of California